The 1930 Washington Huskies football team was an American football team that represented the University of Washington during the 1930 college football season. In its first season under head coach James Phelan, the team compiled a 5–4 record, finished in fifth place in the Pacific Coast Conference, and outscored all opponents by a combined total of 182 to 67.

Schedule

References

Washington
Washington Huskies football seasons
Washington Huskies football